Charity of St Thomas of Villanova is an etching by Melchiorre Caffà from the 1660s.

Description 

The print's dimensions are 60 x 40 centimeters.
It is in the collection of MUŻA in Valletta, Malta.

Analysis 
It is an illustration of the sculpture in the church of Sant'Agostino in Rome.

References 

17th-century etchings
1660s works
Arts in Malta
Maltese art